The Public Garden, also known as Boston Public Garden, is a large park in the heart of Boston, Massachusetts, adjacent to Boston Common. It is a part of the Emerald Necklace system of parks, and is bounded by Charles Street and Boston Common to the east, Beacon Street and Beacon Hill to the north, Arlington Street and Back Bay to the west, and Boylston Street to the south. The Public Garden was the first public botanical garden in America.

History
Boston's Back Bay, including the land the garden sits on, was mudflats until filling began in the early 1800s. The land of the Public Garden was the earliest filled, as the area that is now Charles Street had been used as a ropewalk since 1796. The town of Boston granted ropemakers use of the land on July 30, 1794, after a fire had destroyed the ropewalks in a more populated area of the city. As a condition of its use, the ropewalk's proprietors were required to build a seawall and fill in the land which is now Charles Street and the land immediately bordering it (now a part of the Public Garden).

Much of the landfill material came from Mount Vernon, formerly a hill in the Beacon Hill area of Boston. Initially, gravel and soil were brought from the hill to the landfill area by handcart. By 1804, a gravity railroad had been constructed to rapidly bring material from the top of the hill to the marsh; today, Mount Vernon no longer exists, having been completely removed to be used as landfill for the Back Bay.

In February 1824, the city of Boston purchased back the land granted to the ropemakers, for a cost of $50,000. The next year, a proposal to turn the land into a graveyard was defeated by a vote of 1632 to 176. The Public Garden was established in 1837, when philanthropist Horace Gray petitioned for the use of land as the first public botanical garden in the United States. By 1839, a corporation was formed, called Horace Gray and Associates, and made the "Proprietors of the Botanic Garden in Boston." The corporation was chartered with creating what is now the Boston Public Garden. Nonetheless, there was constant pressure for the land to be sold to private interests for the construction of new housing. The year that Boston's Public Garden opened, Mr. John Fottler Sr., dubbed "the Father of Our Parks", delivered the first load of plants ever set at the gardens, from the Hon. Marshall P. Wilder of Dorchester.

While most of the land of the present-day garden had been filled in by the mid-1800s, the area of the Back Bay remained an undeveloped tidal basin. In 1842, the state legislature created The Commissioners on Boston Harbor and the Back Bay, in order to determine how to best develop the land; the state wanted to control the lands and to build an upper-class neighborhood in the area beyond the Public Garden. The City of Boston petitioned the state to grant control over the basin (which was controlled by the then-independent city of Roxbury), in hopes of generating significant revenue from any developments that would be built after filling it in. When the state commission rejected Boston's petition, the Boston City Council threatened to sell the garden to housing developers, which would have significantly reduced the desirability of the area for the upper class elite that the state was hoping to attract.

The conflict between the City of Boston and the Commonwealth of Massachusetts was finally resolved when the Tripartite Indenture of 1856 was agreed to by both parties and passed a general vote of citizens 6,287 to 99. In the agreement, Boston gave up its rights to build upon the Public Garden; in return, it received a strip of land which is now a part of the garden, abutting Arlington Street.

In October 1859, Alderman Crane submitted the detailed plan for the Garden to the Committee on the Common and Public Squares and received approval. Construction began quickly on the property, with the pond being finished that year and the wrought iron fence surrounding the perimeter erected in 1862. Today the north side of the pond has a small island, but it originally was a peninsula, connected to the land. The site became so popular with lovers that John Galvin, the city forester, decided to sever the connection with the land.

The  landscape was designed by George F. Meacham. The paths and flower beds were laid out by the city engineer, James Slade, and the forester, John Galvin. The plan for the garden included a number of fountains and statues, many of which were erected in the late 1860s. The most notable statue is perhaps that of George Washington, done in 1869 by Thomas Ball, which dominates the western entrance to the park facing Commonwealth Avenue. The signature suspension bridge over the middle of the pond was erected in 1867.

Gas lamps were originally used to light the garden at night, but in 1883, construction of electric lamps was begun. There was initially concern over the use of electric lamps, as it would require wires to be run through the garden, and some members of government feared that it would harm the aesthetics of the place. But as electric lighting replaced gas lighting, and vandalism of the garden – such as the theft and destruction of its flowers – was a growing concern, electric lighting was eventually installed throughout.

In the early 20th century, baby alligators were kept in a basin near the Commonwealth Avenue entrance; they were fed live rats and mice by local residents. 

A flagpole stands today on the eastern side of the garden, close to Charles Street and just south of the main entrance there. The original flagpole was struck by lightning and destroyed in 1918, and in 1920 the city appropriated $2,500 for construction of a new one. In 1982, the city granted an additional $25,000 for improvements to the flagpole. A circular granite bench was installed around the pole, with the work being done by the Friends of the Public Garden.

On January 6, 1913, the City Council placed the garden, along with the Boston Common, under the direct management of the Public Grounds Department of the city. That department declared walking upon the grass of the Common or garden to be illegal, and arrests were made for that offense until at least the 1960s. Today, sitting on the grass is permitted except for specific sections of the lawn where a posted sign forbids access.

In 2008 an automated sprinkler system was installed at a cost of $800,000. Heavy foot traffic, a multitude of plant types, the garden's historical and cultural importance, and a variety of microclimates increased the complexity of the automated system.

Originally, the Charles Street side of the Public Garden (along with the adjacent portions of Boston Common) was used as an unofficial dumping ground, due to being the lowest-lying portion of the Garden; this, along with the Garden's originally being a salt marsh, resulted in this edge of the Public Garden being "a moist stew that reeked and that was a mess to walk over, steering people to other parts of the park". This finally changed in the summer of 1895, when the required quantity of soil was made available as a result of the excavation of the Tremont Street Subway, and was used to regrade the Charles Street sides of both the Garden and the Common.

The Public Garden is managed jointly between the Mayor's Office, The Parks Department of the City of Boston, and the non-profit Friends of the Public Garden. It was designated a Boston Landmark by the Boston Landmarks Commission in 1977 and declared a National Historic Landmark in 1987.

Description

Together with the Boston Common, the parks form the northern terminus of the Emerald Necklace, a long string of parks designed by Frederick Law Olmsted. While the Common is primarily unstructured open space, the Public Garden contains a pond and a large series of formal plantings that are maintained by the city and others and vary from season to season. Mostly flat and varying in elevation by less than five feet, the garden is designed in the style of an English landscape garden. A straight pathway, including a bridge that crosses over its pond, spans the two main entrances of Charles and Arlington streets; but its pathways are otherwise winding and asymmetrical.

The Public Garden is rectangular in shape and is bounded on the south by Boylston Street, on the west by Arlington Street, and on the north by Beacon Street where it faces Beacon Hill. On its east side, Charles Street divides the Public Garden from the Common. The greenway connecting the Public Garden with the rest of the Emerald Necklace is the strip of park that runs west down the center of Commonwealth Avenue towards the Back Bay Fens and the Muddy River.

The pond
During the warmer seasons, the  pond is the home of a great many ducks, as well as of one or more swans. A popular tourist attraction is the Swan Boats, which began operating in 1877. For a small fee, tourists can sit on a boat ornamented with a white swan at the rear. The boat is then pedaled around the pond by a tour guide sitting within the swan.

The current pair of swans are mute swans named Romeo and Juliet after the Shakespearian couple, however, it was found that both are female.

Being no more than three feet deep at its deepest point, the pond easily freezes during the colder months. In 1879, the Boston City Council passed an order to maintain the pond for skating during the winter; today, there is an official skating rink maintained at Frog Pond on the Common, instead.

The pond represented a significant health concern shortly after it was constructed, as it was fed by a combination of salt water from the Charles River, sewer water, and fresh water from Frog Pond in the Common. As a result, there was often a thick slime present in the pond, and an accompanying stench. Consequently, the caretakers of the garden drain and clean the pond annually.

Plantings
Permanent flower plantings in the garden include numerous varieties of roses, bulbs, and flowering shrubs. The beds flanking the central pathway are replanted on a rotating schedule throughout the year, with different flowers for each season from mid-spring through early autumn. Plantings are supplied from 14 greenhouses the city operates at Franklin Park for the purpose.

The Public Garden is planted with a wide assortment of native and introduced trees; prominent among these are the weeping willows around the shore of the lagoon and the European and American elms that line the garden's pathways, along with horse chestnuts, dawn redwoods, European beeches, ginkgo trees, and one California redwood. Other notable trees include:

 Beech trees
 European beech
 Purple beech
 Weeping European beech
 River birch
 Castor aralia
 Western catalpa
 Kwanzan cherry
 Kentucky coffee tree
 Tea crab
 Bald Cypress
 Elm trees
 American elm
 Belgian elm
 Camperdown elm
 English elm
 Rock elm
 Scotch elm
 Horsechestnut
 Japanese larch
 Linden trees
 Common linden
 Littleleaf linden
 Star magnolia
 Maidenhair tree
 Maple trees
 Norway maple
 Red maple
 Silver maple
 Oak trees
 Burr oak
 English oak
 Pin oak
 Pagoda trees
 Pagoda tree
 Weeping pagoda
 Redwood trees
 Dawn redwood
 Giant redwood
 Silk tree
 Silverbell
 Japanese stewartia
 Japanese tree lilac
 Tulip tree
 Tupelo
 Yellowwood
 Weeping willow

Statues and structures
Several statues are located throughout the Public Garden.

 Located at the Arlington Street gate and facing Commonwealth Avenue is the equestrian statue of George Washington, designed and cast by Thomas Ball. The statue was funded mostly by donations from local citizens, and was constructed entirely by Massachusetts artists and artisans.
 Just north of the Equestrian Statue is Mary E. Moore's "Small Child Fountain".
 The Ether Monument, located towards the corner of Arlington and Beacon streets in the northwest corner of the garden, commemorates the first use of ether as an anesthetic. Designed by John Quincy Adams Ward and gifted to the city on June 27, 1868, by Thomas Lee, it is the oldest monument in the garden. Standing 30 feet tall and made of granite and red marble, the statue's carved figures tell the Parable of the Good Samaritan.
 Just north of the Ether Monument is Daniel Chester French and Henry Bacon's memorial fountain to the Boston philanthropist George Robert White entitled "The Angel of the Waters", created in 1924. Constructed of granite and bronze, the fountain was disabled in the 1980s and remained so until 2016 when it was repaired and restored by the Friends of the Public Garden at a cost of $700,000.
 The first statue in the Garden that was made by a woman was Anna Coleman Ladd's Triton Babies Fountain on the east side of the garden. Though some people think the children are a boy and girl, they are in fact her two daughters. It was acquired by the garden in 1927.
 Bashka Paeff's "Boy and Bird", in the fountain on the west side of the garden, was made by a Russian immigrant who did the model of it while she was working as a ticket taker at the Park Street Station of the MBTA.
 Lillian Saarinen's fountain piece, "Bagheera", a dynamic statue of the panther from Kipling's Jungle Book, is nearly hidden by a tree.
 A set of bronze statues by Nancy Schön, dating from 1987 and based on the main characters from the children's story Make Way for Ducklings, is located between the pond and the Charles and Beacon streets entrance.
 At the east gate on Charles Street is a bronze statue of Edward Everett Hale by Bela Pratt, presented to the city on May 22, 1913.
 Along the south walk in the park is a statue erected in 1915 of Wendell Phillips (1811–1884), an orator and abolitionist. Mayor John F. Fitzgerald appropriated funds of $20,000 for the statue, which was designed by Daniel Chester French.
 Colonel Thomas Cass, commander of the 9th Regiment Massachusetts Volunteer Infantry which served in the American Civil War is also memorialized on the south walk. The statue was erected in 1899.
 Next to the statue of Cass is Thomas Ball's statue of Charles Sumner, a U.S. senator from Massachusetts from 1851 to 1874. This statue was constructed in 1878.
 The walk also has a statue of Tadeusz Kościuszko, a Polish citizen who fought as a colonel in the American Revolution. The statue was erected by artist Theo Alice Ruggles Kitson in 1927.
 A statue of William Ellery Channing stands at the southwest corner of the garden, facing the Arlington Street Church. Completed in June 1903 by Herbert Adams, it was given to the city by John Foster, a member of that church, and placed in its location at his request.
 The Boston Public Garden Foot Bridge crossing the lagoon, designed by William G. Preston, opened on June 1, 1867. It was the world's shortest functioning suspension bridge before its conversion to a girder bridge in 1921. Its original suspension system is now merely decorative.
 A Japanese garden lantern dating from 1587 was gifted to Boston by Bunkio Matsuki and installed at the edge of the pond in 1906. One of the oldest lanterns of its kind in existence, it was originally in the garden of the Momoya palace in Kyoto and is made of cast iron.
 In July 2004, a memorial was dedicated to the 206 people from Massachusetts who died in the September 11, 2001, terrorist attacks. Designed by Victor Walker, it is located just inside the Public Garden, at the corner of Arlington and Newbury streets.
 At the beginning of the bridge by the steps leading to the Swan Boats is a plaque honoring United States Marine Lt. Michael P. Quinn of Charlestown, who was killed in action in Vietnam on August 29, 1969. The plaque was dedicated by the committee members of the Michael P. Quinn Scholarship Fund on Patriots Day in 1986.

Care and upkeep
The park is maintained by the City of Boston, which in 2005 spent $1.2 million to keep up its three parks. The city's efforts are supplemented by a charitable organization known as the Friends of the Public Garden, also known as the Rose Brigade. The charity helped finance the repair of the Ether Monument in 2006, and hires specialists to help care for the trees and bushes. Volunteers meet regularly to prune and maintain bushes. Financial support also comes from private sources such as the Beacon Hill Garden Club.

Gallery

See also
 List of botanical gardens in the United States
 List of National Historic Landmarks in Boston
 National Register of Historic Places listings in northern Boston, Massachusetts

References
Notes

Bibliography
 

Further reading
 
 Edwin G. Heath. From Round Marsh to Public Garden. The Bostonian, v.2, no.6, 1895.

External links

 Friends of the Public Garden
 Public Garden. Fodors.com. May 22, 2005.
 The Swan Boats of Boston - The Public Garden. May 22, 2005.
 Photos of the Public Garden
 CelebrateBoston: Boston Public Garden
 Boston Public Garden Study Report published by the Boston Landmarks Commission, 1977

 
1837 establishments in Massachusetts
Botanical gardens in Massachusetts
Emerald Necklace
Historic districts in Suffolk County, Massachusetts
Historic districts on the National Register of Historic Places in Massachusetts
Landmarks in Back Bay, Boston
National Historic Landmarks in Boston
National Register of Historic Places in Boston
Parks in Boston
U.S. Route 20